Skároš is a village and municipality in Košice-okolie District in the Kosice Region of eastern Slovakia.

History
In historical records the village was first mentioned in 1270 (Skarus), when it belonged to Trstené pri Hornáde.

Geography
The village lies at an altitude of 244 metres and covers an area of 38.877 km². The municipality has a population of 1052 people.

External links
http://www.statistics.sk/mosmis/eng/run.html
http://www.cassovia.sk/obce/skaros/

Villages and municipalities in Košice-okolie District